Amaz may refer to:

 Amaz (gamer) (born 1991), Hearthstone streamer on Twitch
 Agence et Messageries Aérienne du Zaïre (AMAZ), a defunct a Zairean airline
 Nara Amaz, one of the G G In In Der 44 union councils, administrative subdivisions, of Haripur District in the Khyber Pakhtunkhwa province of Pakistan
 Amaz, character played by Shashi Kapoor in 1967 British film Pretty Polly
 The Amaz!ng Meeting, an annual conference that focuses on science, skepticism, and critical thinking

See also
 Amaze (disambiguation)
 Amazing (disambiguation)